Li Hongxue (born March 9, 1984, in Harbin, Heilongjiang) is a Chinese cross-country skier who has competed since 2003. Participating in two Winter Olympics, she earned her best finish of 16th in the 4 x 5 km relay at Turin in 2006. She also earned her best individual finish of 27th in the 7.5 km + 7.5 km double pursuit event at those same games.

Li's best finish at the FIS Nordic World Ski Championships was tenth in the 4 x 5 km relay at Sapporo in 2007 while her best individual finish was 18th in a 30 km event at those same championships.

Her best World Cup was 13th in an individual sprint finish at China in 2007.

References
 
 
 

1984 births
Chinese female cross-country skiers
Cross-country skiers at the 2006 Winter Olympics
Cross-country skiers at the 2010 Winter Olympics
Cross-country skiers at the 2014 Winter Olympics
Living people
Olympic cross-country skiers of China
Tour de Ski skiers
Asian Games medalists in cross-country skiing
Cross-country skiers at the 2003 Asian Winter Games
Cross-country skiers at the 2007 Asian Winter Games
Cross-country skiers at the 2011 Asian Winter Games
Cross-country skiers at the 2017 Asian Winter Games
Asian Games silver medalists for China
Asian Games bronze medalists for China
Medalists at the 2003 Asian Winter Games
Medalists at the 2007 Asian Winter Games
Medalists at the 2011 Asian Winter Games
Medalists at the 2017 Asian Winter Games
Skiers from Harbin
21st-century Chinese women